Anna-Lise Williamson  MASSAf is a Professor of Virology at the University of Cape Town. Williamson obtained her PhD  from the University of the Witwatersrand in 1985. Her area of expertise is human papillomavirus, but is also known on an international level for her work in developing vaccines for HIV. These vaccines have been introduce in phase 1 of clinical trial. Williamson has published more than 120 papers.

Education 

Williamson received a PhD at the University of the Witwatersrand in 1985. Her Ph.D. thesis  was entitled "An Electron Microscopic and Immunocytochemical Study of Jaagsiekte". Williamson was also a fellow at the Royal Society of South Africa and at the University of Cape Town.

Accomplishments 

Anna-Lise Williamson is the Director of University of the Cape Town vaccine Research group GLP. Her area of expertise and what she is best known for is Human Papillomavirus and HIV Vaccines.
 Awarded a Chair in Vaccinology 2008 (South African Research Chairs Initiative)
 Head of World Health Organization human papillomavirus Labnet lab for the Africa Region
 Joint Head of University of Cape Town, National Institute for communicable Diseases, and National health Laboratory Service Molecular Epidemiology Laboratory
 Member of the South African HPV Advisory Board
 Member of the Academy of Science of South Africa

Contributions 

Anna-Lise Williamson is the head of the HIV vaccine development and human papilloma research group at the University of Cape Town. There, Williamson and a team of over 30 people are developing vaccines for HIV-1 subtype C virus. This strain is known to be the most Virulent, and known to be the principle strain that leads to AIDS.The goal of the investigation is to create affordable and effective HIV-1 C vaccines, that would increase the longevity of memory T cells and develop a more functional use of the CD4+ and CD8+ cell response. Two vaccines have been selected to move forward in clinical trials. These vaccines are DNA vaccines and a modified vaccinia virus Ankara vaccine. The vaccines were developed as part of the South African AIDS Vaccine Initiative (SAAVI).

Selected publications 
Anna-Lise Williamson has published over 120 papers. Her publications mainly consists of her area of expertise addressing HIV vaccine development, HIV virus, and HPV virus.

 The purpose of this publication is to identify subtypes of HIV-1 in both homosexual and heterosexual males in the Cape Town, South Africa population.
 The goal of this publication is to identify the prevalence and risk factors associated with HPV Infection, and HPV-16 antibody in the population of Southern Africa.

References

Sources

External links 
 
 Anna-Lise Williamson's Profile at Institute of Infectious Disease and Molecular Medicine, UCT
 Anna-Lise Williamson's Profile at the Department of Medical Virology, UCT

Year of birth missing (living people)
Living people
South African virologists
Academic staff of the University of Cape Town
University of the Witwatersrand alumni
South African women scientists
21st-century women scientists
Fellows of the Royal Society of South Africa
Members of the Academy of Science of South Africa